The Secretariat of the 16th Congress of the All-Union Communist Party (Bolsheviks) was in session from 1930 to 1934.

Composition

Members

Candidate

References

Secretariat of the Central Committee of the Communist Party of the Soviet Union members
1930 establishments in the Soviet Union
1934 disestablishments in the Soviet Union